Stanisławów  is a village in the administrative district of Gmina Przyrów, in Częstochowa County, Silesian Voivodeship, in southern Poland.

The village has a population of 93.

References

Villages in Częstochowa County